Rollo Percival Loring Weeks is a British businessman and former actor. He is best known for his titular roles in the films The Little Vampire (2000) and The Thief Lord (2006).

Early life
Weeks was born in Chichester, England, the son of Robin and Susan Weeks, and the younger brother of British actresses Honeysuckle Weeks and Perdita Weeks. He attended the Sylvia Young Theatre School and Stowe School.

Career
Weeks' first screen appearance was, according to his sister Honeysuckle, who told the story when appearing on The Late Late Show with Craig Ferguson in 2014, for a Devon Custard advertisement, aged 6, which ended abruptly when Rollo was sick whilst eating the sponsors product. Weeks' debut film, as a child actor, was playing vampire Rudolph Sackville-Bagg in The Little Vampire (2000), directed by Uli Edel, which earned Weeks a Young Artist Award nomination. He also appeared in Stephen Poliakoff's The Lost Prince (filmed 2002, released 2003) as the young George, Duke of Kent, in a film about the disabled Prince John. This was followed by roles in Girl With a Pearl Earring (2003) and The Queen of Sheba's Pearls (2004). 

His second turn as a title character came as Scipio in The Thief Lord (2006), a movie based on Cornelia Funke's novel The Thief Lord and directed by Richard Claus. Weeks has also appeared in two television shows: Berkeley Square (1998) as Lord Louis Wilton and Goggle Eyes (1993) as Joseph. In 2009 he appeared in the second part of the Shark Week special Blood in the Water and played the character Guido in Chéri. In 2010, he played Jacob in Booked Out, about the lives of characters within an aging block of flats.

In 2016, Weeks was reported to be one of "a dynamic trio of young hospitality industry insiders" opening a new fast food outlet called Fancy Funkin Chicken in Coldharbour Lane, Brixton. The restaurant closed permanently in 2020.

Filmography

References

External links

1987 births
Living people
English male film actors
English male television actors
People educated at Stowe School
People from Chichester
20th-century British male actors
21st-century British male actors
English male child actors